Maudie Bitar is a Lebanese journalist and critic. She has worked for and published extensively in an-Nahar (Lebanon) and al-Hayat (London) newspapers. She writes a regular column on Western literature in al-Hayat. Her articles have also appeared in al-Wasat, and Banipal published her original review of Syrian author Haifa Bitar in an English translation by Issa Boullata. In January 2012, she was named as a judge for the 2012 Arabic Booker Prize.

References

Lebanese literary critics
Lebanese women literary critics
Lebanese journalists
Lebanese women journalists
Lebanese writers
Lebanese women writers
Lebanese columnists
Lebanese women columnists
Living people
Year of birth missing (living people)